Georges Mills is an unincorporated community in the town of Sunapee in Sullivan County, New Hampshire, in the United States. It is located in the northeast corner of the town between the north end of Lake Sunapee and the south shore of Otter Pond. New Hampshire Route 11 runs through the village, leading east to New London and south to the center of Sunapee.

Georges Mills has a separate ZIP code (03751) from the rest of the town of Sunapee.

References

Unincorporated communities in New Hampshire
Unincorporated communities in Sullivan County, New Hampshire
Sunapee, New Hampshire